The works of Herbert Maryon (1874–1965) were made in a variety of mediums. They were intended to be decorative, functional, or commemorative, and were primarily made during the first four decades of the twentieth century, a span that marked the first half of Maryon's career. In addition to being a sculptor and a goldsmith, Maryon was also an archaeologist, conservator, author, and authority on ancient metalwork—he saw his career as an artist carry him through the Second World War; a second career as a conservator at the British Museum brought him note for his work on the finds from the Sutton Hoo ship-burial.

Maryon designed, executed, and exhibited works while an art student, and as an art teacher. In 1899, while still in school—an education that included studies at the Polytechnic (probably Regent Street), The Slade, Saint Martin's School of Art, and the Central School of Arts and Crafts—Maryon used the Arts and Crafts Exhibition Society's event at the New Gallery to exhibit some of his earliest works: a shield of arms with silver cloisonné, and a silver cup that was designed by William Lethaby, who taught Maryon at the Central School. The following year Maryon became the first director of the Arts and Crafts-inspired Keswick School of Industrial Art, and until his departure in 1904 his work primarily consisted of designs and executions for the school. Maryon's pieces for the school ranged from individual commissions to utilitarian tableware; particularly with more functional designs, multiple examples were sometimes executed.

Maryon's career became more academic following his departure from Keswick. During his time teaching sculpture and other forms of art, however—from 1907 until 1927 at the University of Reading, and from 1927 until 1939 at Durham University's Armstrong College—he continued taking commissions. These included the designs for a statue, memorial plaques, and at least three war memorials: including the University of Reading War Memorial, where Maryon worked.

Works 
The following is a substantially incomplete list of the works of Herbert Maryon.

References

Bibliography 
  
  
  
 
  
  
  
  
  
  
  
  
  
 
  
  
  
 
 
  

Maryon, Herbert
Maryon, Herbert